Araeococcus pectinatus is a plant species in the genus Araeococcus. This species is native to Costa Rica, Panama, and Colombia.

References

pectinatus
Plants described in 1931
Flora of Panama
Flora of Colombia
Flora of Costa Rica